Ore is natural rock or sediment that contains one or more valuable minerals concentrated above background levels, typically containing metals, that can be mined, treated and sold at a profit. The grade of ore refers to the concentration of the desired material it contains. The value of the metals or minerals a rock contains must be weighed against the cost of extraction to determine whether it is of sufficiently high grade to be worth mining, and is therefore considered an ore. A complex ore is one containing more than one valuable mineral.

Minerals of interest are generally oxides, sulfides, silicates, or native metals such as copper or gold. Ore bodies are formed by a variety of geological processes generally referred to as ore genesis, and can be classified based on their deposit type. Ore is extracted from the earth through mining and treated or refined, often via smelting, to extract the valuable metals or minerals. Some ores, depending on their composition, may pose threats to health or surrounding ecosystems.

The word ore is of Anglo-Saxon origin, meaning lump of metal.

Ore Minerals, Gangue Minerals, and Tailings 
In most cases, an ore does not consist entirely of a single ore mineral but it is mixed with other valuable minerals and with unwanted or valueless rocks and minerals. The part of an ore that is not economically desirable and that can not be avoided in mining is known as gangue. The valuable ore minerals are separated from the gangue minerals by froth flotation, gravity concentration, electric or magnetic methods, and other operations known collectively as mineral processing or ore dressing.

Mineral processing consists of first liberation, to free the ore from the gangue, and concentration to separate the desired mineral(s) from it. Once processed, the gangue is known as tailings, which are useless but potentially harmful materials produced in great quantity, especially from lower grade deposits.

Ore deposits 

An ore deposit is an economically significant accumulation of minerals within a host rock. This is distinct from a mineral resource in that it is a mineral deposit occurring in high enough concentration to be economically viable. An ore deposit is one occurrence of a particular ore type. Most ore deposits are named according to their location, or after a discoverer (e.g. the Kambalda nickel shoots are named after drillers), or after some whimsy, a historical figure, a prominent person, a city or town from which the owner came, something from mythology (such as the name of a god or goddess) or the code name of the resource company which found it (e.g. MKD-5 was the in-house name for the Mount Keith nickel sulphide deposit).

Classification 

Ore deposits are classified according to various criteria developed via the study of economic geology, or ore genesis. The following is a general categorization of the main ore deposit types:

Magmatic Deposits

Magmatic deposits are ones who originate directly from magma
 Pegmatites are very coarse grained, igneous rocks. They crystalize slowly at great depth beneath the surface, leading to their very large crystal sizes. Most are of granitic composition. They are a large source of industrial minerals such as quartz, feldspar, spodumene, petalite, and rare lithophile elements.
 Carbonatites are an igneous rock whose volume is made up of over 50% carbonate minerals. They are produced from mantle derived magmas, typically at continental rift zones. They contain more rare earth elements than any other igneous rock, and as such are a major source of light rare earth elements.
 Magmatic Sulfide Deposits form from mantle melts which rise upwards, and gain sulfur through interaction with the crust. This causes the sulfide minerals present to be immiscible, precipitating out when the melt crystallizes. Magmatic sulfide deposits can be subdivided into two groups by their dominant ore element:
 Ni-Cu, found in komatiites, anorthosite complexes, and flood basalts. This also includes the Sudbury Nickle Basin, the only known astrobleme source of such ore.
 Platinum Group Elements (PGE) from large mafic intrusions and tholeiitic rock.
 Stratiform Chromites are strongly linked to PGE magmatic sulfide deposits. These highly mafic intrusions are a source of chromite, the only chromium ore. They are so named due to their strata-like shape and formation via layered magmatic injection into the host rock. Chromium is usually located within the bottom of the intrusion. They are typically found within intrusions in continental cratons, the most famous example being the Bushveld Complex in South Africa.
 Podiform Chromitites are found in ultramafic oceanic rocks resulting from complex magma mixing. They are hosted in serpentine and dunite rich layers and are another source of chromite.
 Kimberlites are a primary source for diamonds. They are originate from depths of 150 km in the mantle and are mostly composed of crustal xenocrysts, high amounts of magnesium, other trace elements, gases, and in some cases diamond.

Metamorphic deposits

These are ore deposits which form as a direct result of metamorphism.

 Skarns occur in numerous geologic settings worldwide. They are silicates derived from the recrystallization of carbonates like limestone through contact or regional metamorphism, or fluid related metasomatic events. Not all are economic, but those that are, are classified depending on the dominant element such as Ca, Fe, Mg, or Mn among many others. They are one of the most diverse and abundant mineral deposits. As such they are classified solely by their common mineralogy, mainly garnets and pyroxenes.
 Greisens, like skarns, are a metamorphosed silicate, quartz-mica mineral deposit. Formed from a granitic protolith due to alteration by intruding magmas, they are large ore sources of tin and tungsten in the form of wolframite, cassiterite, stannite and scheelite.

Porphyry Copper Deposits

These are the leading source of copper ore. Porphyry copper deposits form along convergent boundaries and are thought to originate from the partial melting of subducted oceanic plates and subsequent concentration of Cu, driven by oxidation. These are large, round, disseminated deposits containing on average 0.8% copper by weight.

Hydrothermal

Hydrothermal deposits are a large source of ore. They form as a result of the precipitation of dissolved ore constituents out of fluids.

 Mississippi Valley-Type (MVT) deposits precipitate from relatively cool, basal brinal fluids within carbonate strata. These are sources of lead and zinc  sulphide ore.
 Sediment-Hosted Stratiform Copper Deposits (SSC) form when copper sulphides precipitate out of brinal fluids into sedimentary basins near the equator. These are the second most common source of copper ore after porphyry copper deposits, supplying 20% of the worlds copper in addition to silver and cobalt.
 Volcanogenic Massive Sulphide (VMS)
 VMS deposits form on the seafloor from precipitation of metal rich solutions, typically associated with hydrothermal activity. They take the general form of a large sulphide rich mound above disseminated sulphides and viens. VMS deposits are a major source of Zn, Cu, Pb, Ag, and Au.
 Sedimentary exhalative sulphide deposits (SEDEX) are a copper sulphide ore which form in the same manor as VMS from metal rich brine, but are hosted within sedimentary rocks and are not directly related to volcanism.
 Orogenic Gold Deposits
 A bulk source for gold, with 75% of gold production originating from orogenic gold deposits. Formation occurs during late stage mountain building (see orogeny) where metamorphism forces gold containing fluids into joints and fractures where they precipitate. These tend to be strongly correlated with quartz veins.
 Epithermal Vein deposits form in the shallow crust from concentration of metal bearing fluids into veins and stockworks where conditions favour precipitation. These volcanic related deposits are a source of gold and silver ore, the primary precipitants.

Sedimentary Deposits

 Laterites form from the weathering of highly mafic rock near the equator. They can form in as little as one million years and are a source of Fe, Mn and Al. They may also be a source of nickle and cobalt when the parent rock is enriched in these elements.
 Banded Iron Formations (BIFs) are the highest concentration of any single metal available. They are composed of chert beds alternating between high and low iron concentrations. Their deposition occurred early in Earth's history when the atmospheric composition was significantly different than today. Iron rich water is thought to have upwelled where it oxidized to Fe (III) in the presence of early photosynthtic plankton producing oxygen. This iron then precipitated out and deposited on the ocean floor. The banding is thought to be a result of changing plankton population.
 Sediment Hosted Copper forms from the precipitation of a copper rich oxidized brine into sedimentary rocks. These are a source of copper primarily in the form of copper-sulfide minerals.
 Placer deposits are the result of weathering, transport, and subsequent concentration of a valuable mineral via water or wind. They are typically sources of Au, PGE's, sulfide minerals, Sn, W, and REE's. A placer deposit is considered alluvial if formed via river, colluvial if by gravity, and eluvial when close to their parent rock.

Extraction 

The extraction of ore deposits generally follows these steps. Progression from stages 1–3 will see a continuous disqualification of potential ore bodies as more information is obtained on their viability:

 Prospecting to find where an ore is located. The prospecting stage generally involves mapping, geophysical survey techniques (aerial and/or ground-based surveys), geochemical sampling, and preliminary drilling.
 After a deposit is discovered, exploration is conducted to define its extent and value via further mapping and sampling techniques such as targeted diamond drilling to intersect the potential ore body. This exploration stage determines ore grade, tonnage, and if the deposit is a viable economic resource.
 A feasibility study then considers the theoretical implications of the potential mining operation in order to determine if it should move ahead with development. This includes evaluating the economically recoverable portion of the deposit, marketability and payability of the ore concentrates, engineering, milling and infrastructure costs, finance and equity requirements, potential environmental impacts, political implications, and a cradle to grave analysis from the initial excavation all the way through to reclamation. Multiple experts from differing fields must then approve the study before the project can move on to the next stage. Depending on the size of the project, a pre-feasibility study is sometimes first performed to decide preliminary potential and if a much costlier full feasibility study is even warranted.
 Development begins once an ore body has been confirmed economically viable, and involves steps to prepare for its extraction such as building of a mine plant and equipment.
 Production can then begin, and is the operation of the mine in an active sense. The time a mine is active is dependent on its remaining reserves and profitability. The extraction method used is entirely dependent on the deposit type, geometry, and surrounding geology. Methods can be generally categorized into surface mining such as open pit or strip mining, and underground mining such as block caving, cut and fill, and stoping.
 Reclamation, once the mine is no longer operational, makes the land where a mine had been suitable for future use.

With rates of ore discovery in a steady decline since the mid 20th century, it is thought that most surface level, easily accessible sources have been exhausted. This means progressively lower grade deposits must be turned to, and new methods of extraction must be developed.

Hazards 

Some ores contain heavy metals, toxins, radioactive isotopes and other potentially negative compounds which may pose a risk to the environment or health. The exact effects an ore and it's tailings have is dependent on the minerals present. Tailings of particular concern are those of older mines, as containment and remediation methods in the past were next to non-existant, leading to high levels of leaching into the surrounding environment. Mercury and arsenic are two ore related elements of particular concern. Additional elements found in ore which may have adverse health affects in organisms include iron, lead, uranium, zinc, silicon, titanium, sulfur, nitrogen, platinum,and chromium. Exposure to these elements may result in respiratory and cardiovascular problems and neurological issues. These are of particular danger to aquatic life if dissolved in water. Ores such as those of sulphide minerals may severely increase the acidity of their immediate surroundings and of water, with numerous, long lasting impacts on ecosystems. When water becomes contaminated it may transport these compounds far from the tailings site, greatly increasing the affected range.

Uranium ores and those containing other radioactive elements may pose a significant threat if leaving occurs and isotope concentration increases above background levels. Radiation can have severe, long lasting environmental impacts and cause irreversible damage to living organisms.

History 

Metallurgy began with the direct working of native metals such as gold, lead and copper. Placer deposits, for example, would have been the first source of native gold. The first exploited ores were copper oxides such as malachite and azurite, over 7000 years ago at Çatalhöyük . These were the easiest to work, with relatively limited mining and basic requirements for smelting. It is believed they were once much more abundant on the surface than today. After this, copper sulphides would have been turned to as oxide resources depleted and the bronze age progressed. Lead production from galena smelting may have been occurring at this time as well.

The smelting of arsenic-copper sulphides would have produced the first bronze alloys. The majority of bronze creation however required tin, and thus the exploitation of cassiterite, the main tin source, began.  Some 3000 years ago, the smelting of iron ores began in Mesopotamia. Iron oxide is quite abundant on the surface and forms from a variety of processes.

Until the 18th century gold, copper, lead, iron, silver, tin, arsenic and mercury were the only metals mined and used.  In recent decades, Rare Earth Elements have been increasingly exploited for various high-tech applications. This has lead to an ever growing search for REE ore and novel ways of extracting said elements.

Trade 
Ores (metals) are traded internationally and comprise a sizeable portion of international trade in raw materials both in value and volume. This is because the worldwide distribution of ores is unequal and dislocated from locations of peak demand and from smelting infrastructure.

Most base metals (copper, lead, zinc, nickel) are traded internationally on the London Metal Exchange, with smaller stockpiles and metals exchanges monitored by the COMEX and NYMEX exchanges in the United States and the Shanghai Futures Exchange in China.

Iron ore is traded between customer and producer, though various benchmark prices are set quarterly between the major mining conglomerates and the major consumers, and this sets the stage for smaller participants.

Other, lesser, commodities do not have international clearing houses and benchmark prices, with most prices negotiated between suppliers and customers one-on-one. This generally makes determining the price of ores of this nature opaque and difficult. Such metals include lithium, niobium-tantalum, bismuth, antimony and rare earths. Most of these commodities are also dominated by one or two major suppliers with >60% of the world's reserves. The London Metal Exchange aims to add uranium to its list of metals on warrant.

The World Bank reports that China was the top importer of ores and metals in 2005 followed by the US and Japan.

Important ore minerals 
For detailed petrographic descriptions of ore minerals see Tables for the Determination of Common Opaque Minerals by Spry and Gedlinske (1987).
 Acanthite (cooled polymorph of Argentite): Ag2S for production of silver
 Barite: BaSO4
 Bauxite Al(OH)3 and AlOOH, dried to Al2O3 for production of aluminium
 Beryl: Be3Al2(SiO3)6
 Bornite: Cu5FeS4
 Cassiterite: SnO2
 Chalcocite: Cu2S for production of copper
 Chalcopyrite: CuFeS2
 Chromite: (Fe, Mg)Cr2O4 for production of chromium
 Cinnabar: HgS for production of mercury
 Cobaltite: (Co, Fe)AsS
 Columbite-Tantalite or Coltan: (Fe, Mn)(Nb, Ta)2O6
 Galena: PbS
 Native gold: Au, typically associated with quartz or as placer deposits
 Hematite: Fe2O3
 Ilmenite: FeTiO3
 Magnetite: Fe3O4
 Malachite: Cu2CO3(OH)2
 Molybdenite: MoS2
 Pentlandite: (Fe, Ni)9S8
 Pollucite: 
 Pyrolusite: MnO2
 Scheelite: CaWO4
 Smithsonite: ZnCO3
 Sperrylite: PtAs2 for production of platinum
 Sphalerite: ZnS
 Uraninite (pitchblende): UO2 for production of metallic uranium
 Wolframite: (Fe, Mn)WO4

See also 

 Economic geology
 Extractive metallurgy (ore processing)
 Froth Flotation
 Mineral resource classification
 Ore genesis
 Petrology

References

Further reading 
 DILL, H.G. (2010) The "chessboard" classification scheme of mineral deposits: Mineralogy and geology from aluminum to zirconium, Earth-Science Reviews, Volume 100, Issue 1-4, June 2010, Pages 1-420

External links 

Economic geology
Mining